Dyrestuy (Derestei) is a rural locality (a selo) in Dzhidinsky District, Republic of Buryatia, Russia. The population was 1,095 as of 2010. There are 10 streets.

Geography 
Dyrestuy is located 58 km east of Petropavlovka (the district's administrative centre) by road. Dzhida is the nearest rural locality.

References 

Rural localities in Dzhidinsky District